Ardozyga tetralychna is a species of moth in the family Gelechiidae. It was described by Oswald Bertram Lower in 1902. It is found in Australia, where it has been recorded from Victoria and New South Wales.

The forewings are dark fuscous, with a slight purplish tinge and a small yellow-ochreous spot at the base in the middle. The stigmata are small, white, the plical obliquely beyond the first discal. There is a row of small white dots around the posterior part of the costa and termen. The hindwings are grey.

References

Ardozyga
Moths described in 1902
Moths of Australia